Baylis is a surname. Notable people with the surname include:

Abraham B. Baylis (1811–1882), American businessman
Anna Baylis (born 1976), Australian mountain biker
Charles A. Baylis (1902–1975), American philosopher
Edward Baylis (1791–1861), British mathematician and businessman
Evan Baylis (born 1993), American football player
Francoise Baylis (born 1961), Canadian bioethicist
Frank Baylis (born 1962), Canadian politician
Geoff Baylis (1913–2003), New Zealand botanist
Gloria Baylis (1929–2017), Barbadian-Canadian civil rights activist
Hank Baylis (1923–1980), American baseball player
Henry Baylis (1826–1905), Australian police magistrate
James Baylis (died 1870), Irish theatre director
Jearld Baylis (born 1962), Canadian football player
John R. Baylis (1885–1963), American chemist and engineer
Keith Baylis (born 1947), English cricketer
Lilian Baylis (1874–1937), British theatrical producer and manager
Liz Baylis (born 1963), American sailor
Maggie Baylis (1912–1997), American graphic designer
Marc Baylis (born 1977), British actor
Matthew Baylis (born 1971), British novelist and screenwriter
Myrtle Baylis (1920–2014), Australian cricket and netball international
Nadine Baylis (1940–2017), British stage and costume designer
Thomas Baylis (disambiguation), several people
Trevor Baylis (1937–2018), English inventor
William Baylis (born 1962), American sailor